Aleksey Nikolayevich Kamanin (Алексей Николаевич Каманин, born 6 June 1978 in Odessa) is a Russian handball player. He played for the Russia men's national handball team as a right back. He was a part of the team at the 2008 Summer Olympics. On club level he played for Chekhovskiye Medvedi in Russia.

References

1978 births
Living people
Russian male handball players
Handball players at the 2008 Summer Olympics
Olympic handball players of Russia
Sportspeople from Odesa